The Boston Red Sox Hall of Fame was instituted in 1995 to recognize the careers of selected former Boston Red Sox players, coaches and managers, and non-uniformed personnel. A 15-member selection committee of Red Sox broadcasters and executives, past and present media personnel, and representatives from The Sports Museum of New England and the BoSox Club are responsible for nominating candidates.

Criteria
The criteria for selection into the Hall is as follows:
Player to be eligible for nomination must have played a minimum of three years with the Boston Red Sox and must also have been out of uniform as an active player a minimum of three years.
 Non-uniformed honorees such as broadcasters and front office execs are inducted by a unanimous vote of the Boston Red Sox Hall of Fame selection committee. The memorable moment will be chosen by the committee as well.
 Former Boston Red Sox players and personnel in the National Baseball Hall of Fame in Cooperstown, New York, will be automatically enshrined in the Boston Red Sox Hall of Fame.

Inductees
The following 16 people were included as charter members of the Boston Red Sox Hall of Fame, by virtue of prior induction to the National Baseball Hall of Fame:

Eddie Collins (front office)
Jimmy Collins
Joe Cronin
Bobby Doerr
Rick Ferrell
Jimmie Foxx
Lefty Grove
Harry Hooper
Herb Pennock
Red Ruffing
Babe Ruth
Tris Speaker
Ted Williams
Carl Yastrzemski
Tom Yawkey (longtime owner)
Cy Young

Induction ceremonies for additional honorees were held on:

 November 1, 1995
 September 8, 1997
 May 18, 2000
 November 14, 2002

 November 10, 2004
 November 9, 2006
 November 7, 2008
 September 17, 2010

 August 3, 2012
 August 14, 2014
 May 19, 2016
 May 24, 2018

Moments
Each class of inductees has also included a memorable moment in Red Sox history:

Source:

See also

List of Boston Red Sox awards
Ted Williams Museum

Sources

External links
Red Sox Hall of Fame at MLB.com

1995 establishments in Massachusetts
Awards established in 1995
Boston Red Sox
Hall of Fame
Halls of fame in Massachusetts
Major League Baseball museums and halls of fame